Tomyris also called Thomyris, Tomris, or Tomiride, was an East-Iranian Queen who reigned over the Massagetae, an Iranian Saka people of Central Asia. Tomyris led her armies to defend against an attack by Cyrus the Great of the Achaemenid Empire, and, according to Herodotus, defeated and killed him in 530 BC.

Name
The name  is the Latin form of the Ancient Greek name , which is itself the Hellenisation of a Saka name meaning "of family" derived from a cognate of the Avestan word  and of the Old Persian word , meaning "seed," "germ," and "kinship," and of which various reconstructed forms have been proposed, including:
  or 
  or 
  or 
  or 
  or

History

Background
Tomyris was the widowed wife of the king of the Massagetae, whom she succeeded as the queen of the tribe after he died.

War with Persia
When the founder of the Persian Achaemenid Empire, Cyrus, asked for the hand of Tomyris with the intent of acquiring her kingdom through the marriage, she understood Cyrus's aims and rejected his proposal. On the advice of the Lydian Croesus, Cyrus responded to Tomyris's rejection by deciding to invade the Massagetae.

When Cyrus started building a bridge on the Araxes river with the intent of attacking the Massagetae, Tomyris advised him to remain satisfied with ruling his own kingdom and to allow her to rule her kingdom. Cyrus's initial assault was routed by the Massagetae, after which he set up a fancy banquet with large amounts of wine in the tents of his camp as an ambush and withdrew.

Death of Spargapises
The Massagetae, led by Tomyris's son and the commander of their army, Spargapises, who primarily used fermented mare's milk and cannabis as intoxicants like all Iron Age steppe nomads, and therefore were not used to drinking wine, became drunk and were easily defeated and slaughtered by Cyrus, thus destroying a third of the Massagetaean army. Spargapises had been captured by Cyrus, and, once he had become sober and understood his situation, he asked Cyrus to free him, and after Cyrus acquiesced to his pleas, he killed himself.

After Tomyris found out about the death of Spargapises, she sent Cyrus an angry message in which she called the wine, which had caused the destruction of her army and her son, a drug which made those who consumed it so mad that they spoke evil words, and demanded him to leave his land or else she would, swearing upon the Sun, "give him more blood than he could drink."

Death of Cyrus
Tomyris herself led the Massagetaean army into war, and, during the next battle opposing the Massagetae to the forces of Cyrus, Tomyris defeated the Persians and destroyed most of their army. Cyrus himself was killed in the battle, and Tomyris found his corpse, severed his head and shoved it in a bag filled with blood while telling Cyrus, "Drink your fill of blood!"

Aftermath
According to another version of the death of Cyrus recorded by Ctesias, Cyrus died in battle against the Derbices, who were either identical with the Massagetae or a Massagetaean sub-tribe: according to this version, he was mortally wounded by the Derbices and their Indian allies, after which Cyrus's ally, the king Amorges of the Amyrgians, intervened with his own army and helped the Persian soldiers defeat the Derbices, following which Cyrus endured for three days, during which he organised his empire and appointed Spitaces son of Sisamas as satrap over the Derbices, before finally dying.

Little is further known about Tomyris after the war with Cyrus. By around 520 BCE and possibly earlier, her tribe was ruled by a king named Skunxa, who rebelled against the Persian Empire until one of the successors of Cyrus, the Achaemenid king Darius I, carried out a campaign against the Sakas from 520 to 518 BCE during which he conquered the Massagetae, captured Skunxa, and replaced him with a ruler who was loyal to Achaemenid power.

Legacy 

Tomyris became a fairly popular reference in European art and literature during the Renaissance. In art the usual subject was her receiving the head of Cyrus, or putting it into the blood-filled container. This became part of the Power of Women group of women subjects who triumphed in various ways over men. The history of Tomyris has been incorporated into the tradition of Western art; Rubens, Allegrini, Luca Ferrari, Mattia Preti, Gustave Moreau and the sculptor Severo Calzetta da Ravenna are among the many artists who have portrayed events in the life of Tomyris and her defeat of Cyrus and his armies.

Eustache Deschamps added Tomyris to his poetry as one of the nine Female Worthies in the late 14th century.

In Shakespeare's earliest play King Henry VI (Part I),  the Countess of Auvergne, while awaiting Lord Talbot's arrival, references Tomyris (Act II, Sc. iii).

Shakespeare's reference to Tomyris as 'Queen of the Scythians', rather than the usual Greek designation 'Queen of the Massagetae', points to two possible likely sources, Marcus Junianus Justinus' "Abridged Trogus Pompeius" in Latin, or Arthur Golding's translation (1564).

In 1707 the opera Thomyris, Queen of Scythia was first staged in London.

The name "Tomyris" also has been adopted into zoological taxonomy, for the Tomyris species group of Central American moths and the Tamyris genus of skipper butterflies.

590 Tomyris is the name given to one of the minor planets.

The present-day country of Kazakhstan has adopted Tomyris as its national heroine and issues coins in her honour.

In popular culture 
 Toʻmarisning Koʻzlari (The Eyes of Tomyris) is a 1984 book of poems and stories by Uzbek author Xurshid Davron. 
 Toʻmarisning Aytgani (The Sayings of Tomyris) is a 1996 book of poetry by Uzbek poet Halima Xudoyberdiyeva.
 The Kazakhstani film studio "Kazakhfilm" released the film Томирис (Tomyris) in late 2019. She is portrayed by Almira Tursyn.
 Tomyris leads the Scythian civilization in the 2016 4X video game Civilization VI developed by Firaxis Games.
 Washington D.C.-based, female-fronted, heavy metal band A Sound of Thunder, features a song titled "Tomyris," based on the historical figure, on their sixth full-length album It Was Metal released in 2018.

See also 
 Amage
 Zarinaea

Footnotes

Sources

 
 
 
 

6th-century BC women rulers
Saka people
Women in ancient warfare
Women in war in Asia
Iranian queens
Iranic women
Iranian rulers
Massagetae